The Oldsmobile 88 (marketed from 1989 on as the Eighty Eight) is a full-size car that was sold and produced by Oldsmobile from 1949 until 1999. From 1950 until 1974, the 88 was the division's most profitable line, particularly the entry level models such as the 88 and Dynamic 88. The 88 series was also an image leader for Oldsmobile, particularly in the early years (1949–51), when it was one of the best performing automobiles, thanks to its relatively small size, light weight, and advanced overhead-valve high-compression V8 engine. This engine, originally designed for the larger C-bodied and more luxurious 98 series, also replaced the straight-8 on the smaller B-bodied 78. With the large, high performance V8, the Oldsmobile 88 is considered by some to be the first muscle car, although this title is disputed.

Naming conventions used by GM since the 1910s for all divisions used alphanumeric designations that changed every year. Oldsmobile starting after the war changed their designations and standardized them so that the first number signified the chassis platform, while the second number signified how many cylinders. A large number of variations in nomenclature were seen over this long model run — Super, Golden Rocket, Dynamic, Jetstar, Delta, Delmont, Starfire, Holiday, LS, LSS, Celebrity, and Royale were used at various times with the 88 badge, and Fiesta appeared on some station wagons in the 1950s and 1960s. The name was more commonly shown as numerals in the earlier years ("Delta 88", for example) and was changed to spell out "Eighty Eight" starting in 1989.

First generation (1949–1953) 

Oldsmobile introduced the 88 badge in 1949. It was named to complement the already-existing 76 and 98, and took the place of the straight-8 engined 78 in the model lineup. The new car used the same new A-body platform as the straight-6 engined 76 but paired it with the new  Rocket V8 engine producing . This combination of a relatively small light body and large, powerful engine made it widely considered to be the first muscle car. The Rocket 88 vaulted Oldsmobile from a somewhat staid, conservative car to a performer that became the one to beat on the NASCAR (National Association for Stock Car Auto Racing) circuits. 

It won six of the nine NASCAR late-model division races in 1949, 10 of 19 in 1950, 20 of 41 in 1952, and was eventually eclipsed by the low-slung, powerful Hudson Hornet, but it was still the first real "King of NASCAR." This led to increased sales to the public. There was a pent up demand for new cars in the fast-expanding post-World War II economy, and the 88 appealed to many ex-military personnel who were young and had operated powerful military equipment.

The 88 enjoyed great success, inspiring a popular 1950s slogan, "Make a Date with a Rocket 88", and also a song, "Rocket 88", often considered the first rock and roll record. Starting with the trunk-lid emblem of the 1950 model, Oldsmobile would adopt the rocket as its logo, and the 88 name would remain in the Olds lineup until the late 1990s, almost until the end of Oldsmobile itself.

The 1949 model was equipped with an ignition key and a starter push-button to engage the starter. Pushing the starter button would engage the starter, but if the ignition key was not inserted, unlocking the ignition, the car would not start. The car was equipped with an oil bath air cleaner. At the bottom edge of the front fender directly behind the front wheel was a badge that said "Futuramic" which identified an Oldsmobile approach to simplified driving, and the presence of an automatic transmission. V8 Oldsmobiles were automatic-only in 1949 as Oldsmobile lacked a manual gearbox that could handle the torque of the new engine.1948 Oldsmobile Futuramic introduction In 1950, Oldsmobile offered a modified Cadillac manual gearbox for V8 models. The 88 now outsold the six-cylinder 76 lineup, which was dropped entirely after the 1950 model year. It had a 40 ft. turning circle. Hershel McGriff and Ray Elliot won with the 1950 model won the 1950 Carrera Panamericana.

For 1951, the 88 became the entry-level Olds with the discontinuation of the six-cylinder 76 line, which meant that all Oldsmobiles were powered by Rocket V8s. An in-house manual transmission replaced the modified Cadillac gearbox, but as the 1950s progressed, manual shift became increasingly rare in Oldsmobiles and normally could only be obtained by special order. New this year was the more upscale Super 88 line on the new GM B-body which included restyled rear body panels, a more luxurious interior, and a slightly longer  wheelbase as opposed to the  wheelbase which had been standard since the 88's introduction. The station wagon was discontinued and would not reappear until the 1957 model year. New was an I-beam frame. Hydraulic power windows and seats were optional.

Other mechanical features were unchanged with styling changes amounting to new grilles, taillights, and interior revisions. New was the optional automatic headlight control.

For 1953, the base 88 was renamed the DeLuxe 88 for only this one year while the Super 88 continued as a more upscale version. Engines and transmission offerings were the same as 1952. Late in the 1953 model year, a fire destroyed GM's Hydra-Matic plant in Livonia, Michigan, which was then the only source for Hydra-Matic transmissions. The temporary loss of Hydra-Matic production led Oldsmobile to build thousands of its 1953 models with Buick's two-speed Dynaflow automatic transmissions until GM pressed its Willow Run Transmission plant into service to resume Hydra-Matic production. New options this year included Frigidaire air conditioning, power steering, and power brakes.

Second generation (1954–1956) 

The 1954 Oldsmobiles were completely restyled with new longer and lower body shells on the GM B platform with new one piece wrap-around windshields and rear windows. Base models reverted to being simply called 88s after being designated as DeLuxe 88s for only one year and the Super 88 was once again the top series (beneath the larger 98). The Rocket V8 was enlarged from 303 to 324 cubic inches with 88s powered by a two-barrel,  unit while Super 88s came with a  version with four-barrel carburetor. Also, a safety-padded dash became optional, at $17 ($ in  dollars ).

The 1955 models were heavily facelifted with new grillework, taillights and body-side chrome. Horsepower for the 324-cubic-inch Rocket V8 increased to 185 for 88s and 202 for Super 88s. At mid-year, Olds introduced the new pillarless four-door hardtop body, dubbed the Holiday sedan, in both the 88 and Super 88 series. The four-door Oldsmobile 88 Holiday, along with the four-door 98 Holiday, Buick Century Riviera, and Special Riviera, were the first four-door hardtops ever produced. Air conditioning became an option. The 88 had full instrumentation. The term "Morocceen" began to be used to describe the vinyl interior which was used for several decades.

For 1956, styling highlights included a new split grille in front and revised taillights and deck along with revised side chroming. Horsepower for the 324 Rocket V8 increased to 230 for 88s and 240 for Super 88s. A new four-speed Jetaway Hydra-Matic was introduced this year to replace the original Hydra-Matic transmission that Olds had used since 1940. The new Jetaway Hydra-Matic retained the four forward speeds and fluid coupling unit, but added a new "Park" position to the shift quadrant and no longer required band adjustment as a specified routine maintenance. Inside, an oval speedometer replaced the round unit and a new foot-operated parking brake replaced the previous T-handle unit.

Third generation (1957–1958) 

For 1957 only, the basic 88 was officially named Golden Rocket 88, taken from Oldsmobile's 1956 Motorama two-passenger show car. However, the only badging was an "88" underneath each taillight. Also for 1957 the "J2" option was offered, with three two-barrel carburetors, similar to the Pontiac Tri-Power. The Super 88 continued as the upscale mid-line series. Although rare, three speed manual transmissions were still available. Styling highlights were more evolutionary than radical, with a three-piece rear window design marketed as the “Twin-Strut Rear Window.” This was a feature in all series fixed-roof body-styles except station wagons. Buick also used this 3-piece rear window design that year, but without any marketing nickname. Oldsmobile revived station wagons for the first time since 1950 with the Super 88 Fiesta being a four-door hardtop design. In 1957, Oldsmobile added a safety deep-recessed steering wheel.

For 1958, GM was promoting their fiftieth year of production, and introduced Anniversary models for each brand; Cadillac, Buick, Oldsmobile, Pontiac, and Chevrolet. 

The 1958 model is best known in Oldsmobile as the year of the "ChromeMobile" thanks to tremendous splatterings of chrome trim on the body, particularly on the higher-priced Super 88 and Ninety-Eight models. The styling was advertised by Olds as the "Mobile Look." The Dynamic 88 debuted in 1958 and lasted through 1966 positioned as the entry level model below the Super 88. This model featured a more economical Rocket V8 than its more expensive linemates – a de-tuned  version of the 371 cubic-inch Rocket V8 with two-barrel carburation.
A new option for 1958 was a "Trans-Portable" radio that could be removed from the instrument panel through the glove compartment and used as a portable radio for beaches, picnics, etc. thanks to portable batteries.
A revised instrument panel was highlighted by a new deep-dish steering wheel with "horn bars" replacing the long-standing horn ring still common during that period.

Despite an economic recession that cut into new car sales industry wide, and especially affected the medium-priced car market that Olds competed in, Oldsmobile saw only a slight decline in sales for 1958 and even rose in industry standings to fourth-place behind the "Low-Priced Three" of Chevrolet, Ford and Plymouth, while surpassing a now-floundering sister division Buick on the sales charts for the first time in many years. Oldsmobile was also way ahead of other middle-priced competitors such as sister division Pontiac, Mercury, Dodge and Chrysler, along with Ford Motor Company's all-new and ill-fated Edsel, and Chrysler Corporation's DeSoto - the latter two nameplates of which would fade into oblivion within the next three years.

Fourth generation (1959–1960) 

All Oldsmobiles were completely restyled for 1959, with the 88 series given longer, lower and wider styling on a GM B-body chassis. The 88 shared its appearance with the top-model Oldsmobile 98. Styling highlights for the new models, promoted as the "Linear Look," included six-window styling on four-door pillared sedans, glassy semi-fastback rooflines on Holiday coupes and flat-blade rooflines with thin windshield and C-pillars on Holiday sedans which created a large open greenhouse effect. Two-door hardtops were called "Holiday Scenicoupes," whereas four-door hardtops were called "Holiday Sport Sedans." While many 1959 model cars featured bigger and sharper fins, Olds flattened theirs horizontally and reduced chrome from 1958 for a much cleaner look.

The lower-priced Dynamic 88 retained the two-barrel  371 cubic-inch '57–58 Rocket V8, with a  four-barrel version optional.

A simpler but bold new grille and revised rear design with even flatter, horizontal tailfins and new taillights highlighted the 1960 makeover. Other changes included a revised instrument panel and a slimmer transmission tunnel for improved interior space.

Fifth generation (1961–1964) 

An all-new body and chassis with perimeter "Guard Beam" frame and all-coil suspension replacing the previous leaf springs highlighted the 1961 full-sized Oldsmobiles, which were joined by the new compact F-85. The Skyrocket engine was available as an extra-cost option on the Dynamic 88. A new three-speed "Roto" Hydra-matic transmission that was smaller and lighter than the previous four-speed unit was introduced as an option.

The 1961 Oldsmobile body design represented the after-effect of the 1958 recession.  While wheelbases remained the same as in 1960, the overall length and width were reduced slightly – a trend seen throughout all of GM's marques.  Body design focused on a trimmer, fuselage design.  At the bottom of the rear quarters, a "skeg"—a downward fin—jutted outboard to counterbalance the rearward point of the quarter panel, an appearance shared with the 1959 Pontiac Bonneville. Round tail lights, one on each side, were set into the rear cove. For 1961, GM retired the compound curve windshields that it introduced in 1954, and the much hated body dogleg necessitated by the shape of the windshield.  Instead of adopting the cleaner straight angled "A" pillar, Harley Earl, who was nearing the end of his tenure at GM, pushed for a small curved switch back, used in 1961–62, at the outboard base of the windshield.

Like for the previous model year, there were six body styles: a 2-door sedan, the Celebrity Sedan 4-door sedan, the Holiday Sedan 4-door hardtop, the Holiday Coupe 2-door hardtop, the Convertible Coupe drop-top and the Fiesta station wagon, available in both 2- and 3-seat models. All body styles but the 2-door sedan (which was the price leader) were offered both as Dynamic 88 and Super 88. In general all models had thicker pillars than the extremely thin ones found on previous generation models. The Holiday Coupe 2-door hardtop continued the "bubble top" look. The 1961 Holiday Sedan 4-door hardtop had thicker, parallelogram-shaped rear pillar than its predecessor. The extreme "floating roof" look of the 1959–1960 4-door hardtop, with wrap-around panoramic rear window and overhanging roof, had been passed on to the pillared Celebrity Sedan—which had switched from the previous year six-window to a four-window greenhouse. Six-window sedans continued to be offered in the 98 line.

At mid-year, a sporty and luxurious convertible called the Oldsmobile Starfire was introduced. It was based on the Super 88 ragtop and featured leather bucket seats, center console with floor shifter for the Hydra-matic transmission (incidentally the first U.S. full-sized production car to feature an automatic transmission with a console-mounted floor shifter) and many other standard items such as power steering, brakes, windows and driver's seat.

For 1962, the Oldsmobile 88 received a "second-year" facelift that included a revised grille and front bumper. Length was increased somewhat to give the '62 Olds a longer look. Changes to the rear included the removal of the rear fender skegs (personally ordered by GM's Vice President of design Bill Mitchell, who disliked them), and oval taillights, one on each side for Dynamic and Super 88 models replaced the 1961's round units. 1962 Starfires received two oval lights per side, much like the concurrent Oldsmobile Ninety-Eight models. Changes to the greenhouse included new roof lines for the four-door Celebrity Sedan—which relinquished the panoramic rear window—and for the Holiday Coupe two-door hardtop, which received a new fashionable convertible-inspired roofline abandoning the "bubble-top" appearance. The two-door sedan, made redundant as entry-level model by the previous year's introduction of the F-85 compact, was discontinued. Lastly, the Fiesta station wagon was only partially restyled, retaining most of the 1961's rear styling; the 3-seat wagon was now only available as Dynamic 88.

Oldsmobile marketing continued to use the trade names of "Roto-matic Power Steering" and "Pedal-eeze Power Brakes".
All Oldsmobiles featured the "speed bar" speedometer. Introduced in 1959, the speedometer used a rolling black cylinder with sections painted brilliant green, yellow and bright red. As the car went from a standing stop forward in speed, the cylinder rolled, first exposing the green in a window that matched the numeric speed on stationary speed dial for low speeds, yellow at moderate speeds, and finally red at highway speeds. Drivers who topped the car over 100 mph moved the cylinder into an area where only the black base color was visible. For 1963, Oldsmobile would revert to a standard speed needle sweeping over a calibrated set of speeds instead.

1962 Oldsmobile Dynamic 88s and Dynamic 88 Fiesta wagons each had their own upholstery patterns in single and dual-tone colors. Super 88s received tri-tone upholstery and trim. Heaters became standard equipment on all models, and the push-button controls were located to the right of the steering wheel column. Vehicles not equipped with air conditioning received push-button vacuum-operated fresh air vents, called "Summer Ventilation", which replaced the pull level type vents.  This control panel was located on the left of the steering column.  Cars equipped with factory air conditioning replaced the vent control panel with the air conditioning panel, which also contained its own blower switch.  These cars also sported round dash vents for the delivery of A/C airflow. Dynamic 88s received aqua dashboard panel inserts with "OLDSMOBILE" lettering, while Super 88s received panels with that model's nomenclature on the insert.

All full-sized Oldsmobiles underwent extensive body and trim revisions for 1963. Most of the underlying basic body structure and rooflines were carried over from '62 with new exterior sheet metal abandoning the previous years' sculpted mid-sections; Lincoln Continental-style slab sides and sharper edges being employed overall. The Starfire gained an exclusive razor-edged roof treatment utilizing a concave backlight similar to that of the new Pontiac Grand Prix. Different rear quarter panels meant Oldsmobile 88s and the more expensive 98s were more differentiated than before. 1963 also brought about GM's across-the-board adoption of the straight angled windshield "A" pillar on all full-size production vehicles eliminating the unusual 1961 through 1962 reverse-curve treatment. Models and drivetrains in both the Dynamic 88 and Super 88 series were unchanged from 1962. Options that year included a "tilt-away" steering wheel that could be adjusted to six positions, six-way power seats, AM/FM radio and cruise control.

The sharp-edged theme continued for 1964, Oldsmobile's full-sized cars received a minor face-lift that included revised trim, grilles and taillights. New that year was the introduction of price leader for the full-sized Oldsmobile series, the Jetstar 88, which used the same full-size body as other 88 models but also shared key components with that year's redesigned F-85 intermediate. The Jetstar 88 used the smaller 330 V8 and Jetaway (Super Turbine 300) two-speed automatic transmission in place of the 394-cubic-inch V8 and Roto Hydramatic found in other Oldsmobiles, and 9.5-inch (241.3 mm) drum brakes which were less effective than the  drums found on other full-sized Olds models.

Oldsmobile also introduced the Jetstar I for 1964. Not part of the Jetstar 88 line, the Jetstar I instead was a direct competitor to the Pontiac Grand Prix in the same $3,500 price range. Jetstar I models shared the notchback body style with the Starfire along with its more powerful  394-cubic-inch Rocket V8 engine, but with less standard equipment and a lower price tag. Oddly, Oldsmobile teamed the  Rocket engine with a very unsuitable transmission in the Jetstar I, the Jetaway (Super Turbine 300) two-speed unit with "switch pitch" converter.

With the introduction of the Jetstar 88, the Dynamic 88 models were elevated a rung up the ladder for the 1964 model year. Only the Dynamic 88s could be in five body styles: four-door pillared Celebrity Sedan and hardtop Holiday Sedan, two-door hardtop Holiday Coupe, convertible and 2- or 3-seat Fiesta station wagon. The Jetstar 88 was not offered as a station wagon.

1964 was the last for the Super 88 series, which was limited to the two four-door body styles—the Celebrity Sedan and Holiday Sedan. Total production for both four-door Super 88 models reached 19,514 assemblies for the model year.

1964 was also the last year for Oldsmobile to offer full-sized station wagons until the 1971 model year. Oldsmobile's full-size Fiesta wagons (and Buick's Estate Wagons) introduced in 1957 had never been strong sellers. From 1960 to 1963, production per model (Super or Dynamic) and seating capacity (six or nine passenger) never broke 15,000 units. The wagons' bodies weren't made by Fisher Body, but were instead farmed out to Ionia Manufacturing Company of Ionia, Michigan. As Oldsmobile set its sights on more luxury and performance, full-sized wagons weren't in the mix. The division introduced the new Vista Cruiser wagon in mid-1964 that featured a raised roofline and skylights over the rear seat and cargo area. The models were offered with six- or nine-passenger seating with all seats facing forward. The Vista Cruiser used a six-inch (152 mm) stretched wheelbase version of the intermediate F-85/Cutlass. This allowed Oldsmobile (and Buick, which used the same body and stretch wheelbase for its Sport Wagon) to offer a wagon comparable in overall size to the full-sized Chevrolet Impala and Pontiac Catalina wagons, but without diluting the cachet of its full-size cars with a utilitarian body style.

Sixth generation (1965–1970) 

The Delta name in 1965 was an upscale trim line of the Dynamic 88, the Dynamic 88 Delta, replacing the previous top-series B-body Olds, the Super 88. Early '65s were referred to as Dynamic 88 Deltas, but within a few weeks after the start of the model year, Olds began marketing the line as a separate series known as the Delta 88. Other full-sized Oldsmobile model lines included the low-priced Jetstar 88, the volume-selling Dynamic 88, sporty Jetstar I and the sporty and luxurious Starfire, all riding on a  wheelbase. Oldsmobile had some marketing successes naming the Starfire after a United States Air Force fighter Lockheed F-94 Starfire and tried the approach again, naming the Delta 88 after the Convair F-102 Delta Dagger.

All 1965 Olds models featured all new styling and engineering. The B-body cars featured more rounded styling than previous years with Coke-bottle profiles and semi-fastback rooflines on Holiday (two-door hardtop) coupes - Jetstar I and Starfire coupes got a more rounded variation of the squared-off 1963–64 roofline with concave rear window shared by Pontiac's Grand Prix.
Also introduced this year was a new 425 cubic-inch Super Rocket V8 with horsepower ratings ranging from 300 to 370 depending on carburation and compression ratio. The new three-speed Turbo Hydramatic transmission with torque converter replaced the Roto Hydramatic used since 1961. Also new to the option list for 1965 on all B-body cars was a four-speed manual transmission with Hurst floor shifter, which was a seldom-ordered offering.

Few styling changes other than revised grilles and tail sections marked the 1966 full-sized Oldsmobiles. The sporty Jetstar I series was dropped with a lower-priced Starfire only offered as a hardtop coupe taking its place. All other series' 88 models were carried over from 1965 with a new convertible added to the Delta 88 line and the same bodystyle dropped from the Jetstar 88 line.

A new option for all senior Oldsmobiles (88, Ninety-Eight and the new front-drive Toronado) was GM's automatic Comfortron Air Conditioning system first introduced by Cadillac in 1964. Comfortron permitted the driver to automatically set a year-round temperature at a constant level. The basic Frigidaire air conditioning unit offered in previous years continued as before and becoming an increasingly popular option on full-sized Oldsmobiles. Another new option for 1966 was a Tilt-and-Telescopic steering wheel that could be vertically adjusted to six different positions as well as telescoped outward from the instrument panel to improve driver comfort.

For 1967, all GM full-size cars received a mid cycle freshening that featured fuller body panels. More rounded styling cues marked all 1967 Olds 88 models which received longer hoods and shorter decks and more sweeping fastback rooflines on 88 Holiday coupes to emulate the styling of Olds' front-wheel-drive flagship, the Toronado.  Olds 88s received a three part front grille made op of a center prow flanked on either side by headlight pods.  For the first time since 1959, the dual headlights were split apart by parking lights.  Taillights for 88s featured a waterfall design. Interiors made extensive use of wood-tone panels, and bright metal finishes were kept to a minimum.

Model wise, there was more name juggling. The Delmont 88 was introduced for 1967 and produced for just two years, replacing both the Jetstar 88 and Dynamic 88 model lines. The Delmont featured the 330 V8 as standard and the 425 V8 as an option in 1967 and the new stroked "Rocket 455" version of the same engine in 1968. The 425 was standard on the Delta 88. The Delta 88 gained a new sub series called the Delta 88 Custom which had a plusher interior than the standard Delta 88 featuring a Strato bench seat in the Holiday Sedan (four-door hardtop) or, in the Holiday Coupe (two-door hardtop), a choice of either Strato bucket seats with console or Strato bench seat with armrest. The Delta Custom Holiday Coupe was essentially a successor to the former 88-based Starfire series offered in previous years (1961–66) but with a standard 88 semi-fastback roofline rather than the Starfire's squared off roof with concave rear window.  Another styling cue for the Delta Custom was the addition of a second set of tail light reflectors set into the lower portion of the bumper.

New options for 1967 included front disc brakes, stereo 8-track tape player and a Climate Combustion Control system for Rocket V8s designed to regulate carburetor air temperature, boost fuel economy, speed choke warm up and eliminate winter icing to permit easier starting and more efficient operation in cold weather.

The same assortment of 330 and 425 cubic-inch V8 engines were carried over from 1966, as were most transmission offerings except the optional four-speed manual with Hurst shifter, which was discontinued due to low buyer interest.

For 1968, the overall design was a carryover.  New front end with split grille design that would become an Olds trademark in coming years highlighted all 1968 full-sized Oldsmobiles with horizontal lines on 88s  and egg-crate patterns on Ninety-Eights, along with concealed windshield wipers. The split grille was inspired by fighter aircraft at the time with delta wings and dual air intakes for the jet engine as introduced on the Convair F-102 Delta Dagger.
 
The Delmont 88 got a larger 350 cubic-inch V8 as standard equipment and the optional V8 that was standard on Delta 88/Custom and Ninety-Eight was jacked up to 455 cubic inches with a  W-33 option primarily designed as part of the division's police package available as an RPO on all 88's. Horsepower ratings of other Olds engines included 250 for the 350 two-barrel standard in the Delmont 88, 310 for the four-barrel 350 optional in the Delmont 88. Both the 350 and 455 two-barrel Rocket V8 engines were designed to use regular gasoline while the optional 350 and 455 four-barrel carburated "Ultra High Compression" Super Rocket V8s required premium fuel.

The 1969 88 series dropped the Delmont name, leaving the Delta 88 as the base model of the series. The Delta 88 Royale trim, only available on a Holiday Coupe, was added as line-topper above the Delta 88 Custom. It came standard with a more luxurious interior featuring a notchback vinyl upholstered bench seat with armrest or Strato bucket seats with optional center console. For safety, a ceiling mounted shoulder belt was offered in the front seats for both the driver and right passenger. This arrangement provided five belt buckles in the front bench seat. Standard on the Delta 88 Custom and Royale models and optional on the base series was a low compression two-barrel version of the 455 cubic-inch Rocket V8 rated at  designed to use regular fuel. Top option was the  version of the four-barrel 455 V8 designed to run on 98 RON octane fuel available in all Delta 88 models as the W-33 option.

The two-speed Jetaway automatic that was previously offered as an option on the smaller engine 88 models was dropped completely in favor of the GM three-speed Turbo Hydra-Matic 400 transmission previously only offered with the larger engines. Also a new GM-designed Variable-Ratio Power Steering system was introduced as an option.

All full-sized Oldsmobiles were completely restyled for 1969 with more squared off bodylines and rooflines for the Holiday coupes and sedans replacing the semi-fastback look of 1967–68, and ventless front windows on all models. Though the 1969 models were extensively restyled, the basic 1965 chassis design and inner-body structure was retained along with the roofline on the pillared four-door Town sedans.

Inside, headrests were now standard equipment and a new instrument panel included square instruments replacing the round instruments of previous years along with a push-button operated ashtray and rotary glove compartment knob, as well as heating/air conditioning controls relocated from the center of the dash to the left of the steering wheel near the lights and wiper switches. The high-beam lights indicator was a red rocket located on the dash. Also new was a steering column-mounted ignition switch that also locked the steering wheel when not in use – a feature found on all 1969-model General Motors passenger cars, a year before locking steering columns were required by federal mandate starting in 1970.

Only detail changes were made for the 1970 full-sized Oldsmobiles including a new split grille that no longer extended to surround the headlights and a slightly revised rear section. Powertrain selections were carried over from 1969 with both 350 and 455 cubic-inch Rocket V8s now featuring "Positive Valve Rotators" for longer engine life and more efficient operation. A new antenna impregnated into the windshield was introduced this year that replaced the previous fender-mounted unit and was included as standard equipment on all cars equipped with a factory radio. New option this year was a wiper/washer switch mounted in the shift lever knob.  Optional radio was a stereo AM-FM radio and a lower dash mounted eight track tape player.

The 1965–1970 GM B platform is the fourth best selling automobile platform in history after the Volkswagen Beetle, Ford Model T and the Lada Riva.

Seventh generation (1971–1976) 

All GM B-body full-size cars were completely restyled and enlarged for 1971, but continued to ride on a  wheelbase. It reached its maximum size in 1974 at an astounding  in length.  It was available as a pillared four-door Town Sedan, two-door and four-door Holiday hardtops and a convertible. Series models for 1971 included the base Delta 88, Delta 88 Custom and Delta 88 Royale, the latter inheriting the convertible body style previously offered on the base Delta 88. All models received fuselage styling somewhat similar to what Chrysler Corporation introduced on its 1969 models, and new rooflines with a more squared off greenhouse for Town sedans and more rounded lines for Holiday sedans and coupes – the latter receiving reverting to a semi-fastback format.

Also new for 1971 was the Custom Cruiser station wagon, the first full-sized Oldsmobile wagon since 1964. It used the 88's B-body platform with a longer  wheelbase (matching the larger C-body Ninety-Eight) with multi-leaf spring suspensions that differed entirely from the all-coil suspensions used in sedans and coupes. The Custom Cruiser came standard with the larger 455 Rocket V8 and utilized the disappearing clamshell tailgate of other full-size GM wagons.

Engine offerings again included 350 and 455-cubic-inch Rocket V8s ranging from 250 to 340 gross horsepower, all of which featured lowered compression ratios beginning in 1971 to enable use of lower octane regular leaded 91 RON octane, low-lead or unleaded gasoline. Vented power front disc brakes and variable-ratio power steering were now standard equipment on all 88 models. During the 1971 model year, the Turbo Hydra-matic 400 transmission was added to the standard equipment list.

Other highlights for 1971 included a wrap-around instrument panel shared with Ninety-Eight and Toronado models (Toronados had a slightly smoother upper leading edge design) that was highlighted by a large square speedometer and all controls within easy reach of the driver, and a one-year only Flo-Through ventilation system that utilized vents in the trunklid. The system used on all GM B-, C- and E-body cars and the Chevrolet Vega, used the heater fan to draw air into the car from the cowl intake, and force it out through vents in the trunk lid or tailgate. In theory, passengers could enjoy fresh air even when the car was moving slowly or stopped, as in heavy traffic. In practice, however, it didn't work.

1971 was the last model year in which a 3-speed manual transmission was offered on full-sized Oldsmobiles; the rarely-ordered option was dropped in 1972.

Within weeks of the 1971 models' debut, however, Oldsmobile—and all other GM dealers—received multiple complaints from drivers who complained the ventilation system pulled cold air into the car before the heater could warm up—and could not be shut off. The ventilation system was extensively revised for 1972.

For 1972, the Delta Custom series was dropped and the Royale series was expanded to include four-door Town and Holiday sedans. Advertised brake horsepower figures dropped to 155 for the base 350 two-barrel and 250 for the optional 455 four-barrel Rocket V8s thanks to an industry-wide switch in power measurements from the previous gross method (as measured by a dynamometer with no accessories attached) to the net method in which the power measurements were based upon an engine "as installed" in a vehicle with all emission controls and accessories hooked up. Only minor trim changes were made this year that included revised "waterfall" grilles in front and four-segment taillights in the rear. Inside a revised "Flo-Through" ventilation system utilizing vents in the doorjambs replaced the 1971 version which utilized vents in the trunklid.

For 1973, wider and lower split waterfall grilles flanked a new federally mandated  front bumper on all Delta 88 models and larger one-piece rounded rectangular taillights replaced the four-segmented lights of 1972. Model offerings were the same as 1972 with the Delta 88 Royale series now including the sole Olds convertible offering following the demise of the intermediate Cutlass Supreme convertible after 1972.

Director Sam Raimi regularly includes a 1973 Delta 88 in his films. Referred to as "The Classic" by the filmmaker, the car originally belonged to his parents and has made an appearance in the Evil Dead trilogy, his Spider-Man films with Tobey Maguire, Drag Me To Hell and Doctor Strange in the Multiverse of Madness.

In 1974, a  rear bumper was added and taillights reverted to a four-segment design similar to 1972 and the front grilles were narrowed and raised to hood level similar to 1971–72 models. Also, new rooflines were featured on Holiday hardtop coupes with large fixed triangular side windows in the widened "C" pillar.  Unlike the big Chevrolet formal-roof coupes, the Olds retained a small roll-down rear window.  As Oldsmobile completely discontinued two-barrel carbureted engines this year, a new 350 four-barrel Rocket V8 (175 horsepower) became standard equipment with the 455 available as an option. Other highlights this year included an all-new flat instrument panel shared with Ninety-Eight and Toronado models with horizontal sweep speedometer and "Message Center" system of warning lights replacing the wrap-around dash of previous years. A new and seldom-ordered option available on all full-sized Olds models and Toronados were driver's and passenger's-side airbags – among the first to be offered in a production automobile. The Delta 88 Royale ragtop was again the only convertible offered by Olds.

Detail changes for 1975 included revised grilles and taillights along with new rear quarter windows for pillared and Holiday sedans – the latter's design similar to an opera window in September 1974. The same assortment of 350 and 455-cubic-inch Rocket V8s were still offered along with a one-year-only (and seldom-ordered) option of a Pontiac-built 400-cubic-inch V8 with two-barrel carburetor and  rating. All engines were hooked up to a catalytic converter that not only mandated the use of unleaded gasoline but also spelled the end of dual exhaust systems. 1975 was the final year for the Delta 88 Royale convertible, the last of which was built on July 11, 1975. Just under 7200 Delta 88 Royale convertibles were built in 1975 as Oldsmobile made a concerted effort to target the convertible buyer market at the time. The headline on a print ad for a 1975 Olds Delta 88 Royale convertible stated, "Today a beautiful Olds convertible. Tomorrow, a collector's item". The featured car in the ad was a red Delta 88 Royale rag top.

For 1976, the final year of this generation, all Olds 88s received revised grille work, rectangular headlamps and parking lamps directly below instead of in the bumper, with Delta 88 Royale models also getting spring-loaded stand-up hood ornaments. It was also the final year for the Holiday hardtop coupes and sedans, along with the 455 Rocket V8 and the optional airbag system that would generally become universal on production cars and trucks some 15 years later. A one-year only option on Delta 88 Royale Holiday coupes was the Royale Crown Landau package that included a stainless steel roof bar, padded rear quarter vinyl roof, special hood ornament and color-keyed wheelcovers.

Eighth generation (1977–1985) 

The 1977 Delta 88s and other GM B-body cars were considerably downsized from their predecessors in length and wheelbase ( – the same as the four-door 1973–77 A-body Cutlass Sedan) and nearly  lighter in weight, with curb weights dropping to between  depending on model. Other than a reduction in shoulder room, however, interior room was not adversely affected; in fact, headroom and rear seat legroom increased. Both base Delta 88 and Royale models were now only offered in two pillared body styles; a two-door coupe and a four-door Town Sedan. The 1977–1979 Custom Cruiser was now based on the Delta 88's B-body rather than the Ninety-Eight's C-body (thus also sharing the coil spring suspension, rather than the multi-leaf spring) and came with a two-way tailgate rather than the clamshell of 1971–76 models. A fuel economy gauge was optional.

The standard engine was now a  Buick V6 with a Turbo-Hydramatic 200 automatic transmission. An Oldsmobile 260 was the base V8, followed by either a Chevrolet 350 (option code LM1) or Oldsmobile 350 (option code L34). Initially, the Oldsmobile engine came in California and high-altitude cars, the Chevrolet engine came in cars with Federal emissions equipment. The Olds engine returned later in the model year. Oldsmobile's new 403 was the top engine option and came with a THM350 transmission.

The use of a Chevrolet engine caused a situation known as the "Chevy-mobile" affair. GM settled with some Oldsmobile owners by offering them warranty extensions for the Chevrolet-engined Oldsmobiles, or the option of returning those cars in exchange for an Oldsmobile with a genuine Rocket V8. The "return car" option wasn't commonly chosen, because the owner had to pay GM for mileage driven, which could become expensive. This began the era of "corporate" engines, and for many years GM advertisements would include a disclaimer stating '"Oldsmobiles (or other divisions) are equipped with engines manufactured by various GM divisions, subsidiaries and affiliates worldwide."'

As in previous years, base Delta 88 and Royale models differed mainly in exterior and interior trim. Base Deltas had a full bench seat available in cloth-and-vinyl or all-vinyl upholstery, while Royales had a notchback bench seat with armrest or optional 60/40 notchback bench, also available in cloth-and-vinyl or all-vinyl trim. All 88s featured an all-new instrument panel with a horizontal sweep speedometer and heater/air conditioning controls moved to the center of the dash above the radio from the left side of the dash, and continued with the "Message Center" bank of warning lights. The new dash was highlighted with woodgrain trim. The dimmer switch moved from the floor to the turn-signal lever.

For 1978, a Holiday 88 coupe was added to the lineup, featuring Strato bucket seats along with console and floor shifter, Super Stock wheels and two-tone paint schemes. All 88 models received new grilles and revised taillights with drivetrains the same as 1977 except for the addition of the 350 Diesel V8 to the option list.

The 1979 model year saw the addition of a new Delta 88 Royale Brougham series, which included plush "pillowed" seat trim similar to the Ninety-Eight. All models again received revised grilles and other minor changes. It was the last year for the 403 V8 as federal fuel-economy mandates spelled the end of larger engines in order to meet those requirements.

For 1980, all 88s got new and more aerodynamic sheetmetal for improved fuel economy highlighted by rounded square taillights similar to mid-70s 88s, but overall dimensions stayed the same and coupes received a revised roofline. All other engines except the now-discontinued 403 were carried over from 1979.

Only minor grille and taillight lens revisions highlighted the 1981 Delta 88s. The gasoline 350 Rocket V8 was dropped from the option list, leaving only the diesel version available. All other engines including the Buick 231 V6 and Oldsmobile 260 and 307 Rocket V8s were continued. All gasoline engines received GM's new Computer Command Control engine management system. This system was the forerunner of today's OBD-II which is standard on all cars sold in the United States. The system read various parameters, such as vehicle speed, throttle position, engine speed, coolant temperature, and the oxygen content of the exhaust to provide the correct air/fuel mixture for any given driving condition. Also new for 1981 was GM's Turbo-Hydramatic 200-4R transmission, which added an overdrive gear and torque converter clutch (TCC) to contribute to fuel economy and engine longevity. The sporty Holiday 88 coupe was offered for the last time this year.

The 1982 model year saw only minor trim changes for Delta 88, Royale and Royale Brougham models. The same assortment of engines/transmissions were carried over from previous years, though the small 260 V8 was offered for the last time. For 1983, all Oldsmobile 88s received new grilles, hood ornaments and minor trim revisions, including new steering wheels. This would be the last year for the base Delta 88 line, leaving only the Royale and Royale Brougham. Engine offerings were down to three, a standard Buick 231 cubic-inch V6, or optional Oldsmobile V8s including the 307 Rocket and 350 Diesel.

For 1984, all Delta 88s were now Royale or Royale Brougham models. Styling highlights included new grille inserts and red and amber taillights replacing the red lenses. At midyear, a new Royale Brougham LS was added to the 88 line, almost simultaneously with the introduction of a new and downsized 1985 front-wheel drive Ninety-Eight. With the Ninety-Eight being downsized and converted to front-drive, the Royale Brougham LS model of the 88 was now the largest and most luxurious rear-wheel drive car offered by Oldsmobile. Custom Cruiser wagons continued with the same styling changes found on other 88 models.

Only minor changes marked the 1985 model, which was in its last year before a major downsizing and conversion to front-wheel-drive. The same assortment of models in the Royale, Brougham and Brougham LS continued as before, Amber rear turn signals were added. The '85 88s would be the last full-sized Oldsmobile sedans and coupes to feature rear-wheel-drive, Rocket V8 power, and body-on-frame construction. Though the 88 sedans and coupes were downsized and switched to front-drive for 1986, the Custom Cruiser station wagons would continue virtually unchanged through the 1990 model year, and eventually become the only Oldsmobile model powered by an Oldsmobile Rocket V8 engine, for which production ended in 1990 after 42 years.

Ninth generation (1986–1991) 

The headlights changed from square sealed beam quads to integrated regular/high beam composite lamps in 1987. A few NASCAR teams built racecars with 1986 Delta 88 Royale sheetmetal and ran them on the circuit in the 86–88 seasons, but only one victory (with Terry Labonte) was scored.

Due to the federal mandate to add passive restraints, door mounted seat belts were added for 1987.  For 1988, rear shoulder belts were added and anti-lock brakes became an option.  For 1989, the "Delta" name was dropped, as was the hood ornament, leaving the model to simply become the "Eighty Eight," now spelled out instead of using the "88" in numerical form.  Also that year, the amber color was deleted from the taillights and a driver side airbag became an available option.

The Eighty Eight Royale was given a mild facelift in 1990, eliminating the former chromed grille for a body-colored fascia with four slots and the Oldsmobile Rocket logo.  In the rear, new taillights and backup lights extended across the body; once again, chrome trim was deleted. Minor revisions were also made to the interior.  Part of the door panel was revised and the 1990 model also offered new cloth for the seats while the pillow cushion seats on the Brougham were discontinued.  A revised armrest console was added which provided more room.

1991 was the last year for the coupe and last year for this generation Eighty Eight.  Various previously optional features such as pulse wipers and tilt steering wheel became standard.  The model range during this time was the Eighty Eight Royale and more upscale Eighty Eight Royale Brougham.  1991 would be the last year for the "Brougham" trim level on the Eighty Eight.

Engines:
 1986–1988.5 – 3.8 L (231 in³) LG3 V6
 1988.5–1991 – 3.8 L (231 in³) 3800 LN3 V6

Transmissions:
 1986–1988.5 – 440-T4 4-speed automatic overdrive
 1988.5–1991 – 4T60 4-speed automatic overdrive

Voice diagnostic system 
This generation of Delta 88s has an optional voice diagnostic system that alerted the driver of problems. The voice is male and computer synthesized.

In the event of a warning, the door chime plays three times rapidly and then played the voice alert. This happens twice in case the driver misses the warning the first time; every alert also has a corresponding light on the instrument cluster.

Warnings include:

 "The engine coolant level is low!"
 "The engine is overheating! Please stop the engine and consult the owner's manual!"
 "The park brake is not fully released!"
 "The key is in the ignition!" (upon opening the door with the key inserted into the ignition)
 "The headlights are on!" (upon turning off the car with the headlights on) A light would also appear on the dash.

Tenth generation (1992–1999) 

The Oldsmobile Eighty Eight was redesigned for 1992, following the redesign of the Ninety Eight the previous year. This was the last Eighty Eight or 88 model from Oldsmobile (along with its performance LSS and Regency models) before being discontinued in 1999 and being replaced in 2001 with the Aurora.

The Eighty-Eight's front and rear were restyled for 1996, and with it the nomenclature was changed from "Eighty Eight Royale" to three models – Eighty Eight, Eighty Eight LS and LSS (A "Luxury Sports Sedan" targeted to male European car buyers, available with a supercharged V6 and a floor mounted gear shifter).  It is important to note, however, early LSS models (1995) were rarely equipped with the 3800 Supercharged engine.  The LSS was originally a trim level package on the 88 starting in 1992. In 1996 the LSS received Aurora-inspired seats. 1996 was the final year that the original-style rocket (in black and silver) appeared on a hood emblem. 1997 would welcome the new Oldsmobile logo on all Eighty-Eight trims except the Regency.

After the demise of the Ninety-Eight in 1996, Oldsmobile added the Regency to the 1997 and 1998 lineups, which used the same front fenders and chrome grille as the Ninety-Eight sedan but kept the standard Eighty-Eight body. The Regency featured a long list of standard features including traction control, leather upholstery, dual 6-way power seats with power lumbar and a driver's side memory function, a dual-zone automatic climate control system, and an electronic level control for the rear suspension. A driver's side electrochromic outside mirror was also standard on the Regency, a feature that even Cadillac didn't offer as standard equipment. The interior day/night auto-dimming mirror was linked to the outside mirror and dimmed both with the same intensity at the same time. Some of these options, like the 2-driver memory feature, were not available on the Eighty-Eight Royale or LSS.

To commemorate the 50th anniversary of the 88/Eighty-Eight nameplate, Oldsmobile offered a special 50th Anniversary Edition of the 1999 Eighty-Eight. This edition included front and rear leather bench seats from the 98/Regency, steering wheel with audio and HVAC controls, the older rocket logo, electronic climate control unit, gold plated badges, and special Anniversary badges on the C-pillars and front door panels.

All four vehicles used the same  wheelbase and shared an updated version of the H-body. The suspension tuning, interior appointments, and certain exterior trim was used to differentiate the three models.

Engines:
 1992–1994 3.8 L (231 in³) 3800 Series I V6, 
 1995–1999 3.8 L (231 in³) 3800 Series II V6, 
 1995 3.8 L (231 in³) supercharged 3800 Series I V6,  which was only installed on 100 vehicles of its kind.
 1996–1999 3.8 L (231 in³) supercharged 3800 Series II V6, 

From 1992 to 1999, Eighty Eight models were produced in Lake Orion, Michigan, Flint, Michigan, and Wentzville, Missouri.

Year-to-year changes:
 1992: The redesign. Models included the Eighty-Eight Royale and the Eighty-Eight Royale LS. The 1992 full line Oldsmobile factory brochure makes brief mention of the LSS (Luxury Sport Sedan) model in one small photo, yet it doesn't appear later in the options summary. 
 1993: Trunk mounted key cover emblem removed. The Eight Eight LSS returned with better factory promotion of its sporty option package that included: Bucket seats (a pair of right-hand halves of the standard 60/40 split bench seat), steering wheel audio and HVAC controls, floor shifter and center console (borrowed from the previous generation Pontiac Bonneville SSE) in the interior, and full instrumentation for the dash. Sixteen inch alloy wheels, higher spring rates and larger diameter stabilizer bars for the front and rear suspension gave the LSS a firm ride and more controlled handling. 
 1994: The first facelift: Front grille and headlamps were redesigned, 'sculpted' aluminum turbine rims were made available.  A major redesign to the dash added a passenger side airbag and made it less cluttered and more modern. 
All models shared this same 3.8L engine. The optional L67 3800 Supercharged engine, making , was made an available option for the LSS, and later other models. First OEM GPS system introduced by any manufacturer, as an option the Oldsmobile Guidestar.
 1996: The second facelift: New front grille and new round headlights, all body trim was changed to give the car a cleaner, more aerodynamic appearance. Tailamps and rear reflector bar were slightly reshaped. All models were renamed from Eighty Eight Royale to Eighty Eight and Eighty Eight LS ([LS] which migrated from an 88 Royale trim). The LSS continued with the same changes to the exterior as other models, the addition of Aurora styled seats, but the same center console was retained for one more year.
 1997: An upscale, "fully loaded" version of the Eighty-Eight was introduced as the Oldsmobile Regency to satisfy previous Ninety-Eight buyers. All Oldsmobile Eighty Eight and LSS models (except for the Regency) changed badges from the '80s Oldsmobile "Rocket" logo to the 1997–2004 Oldsmobile "Rocket Oval" logo, inspired by the Aurora's logo. The center console on bucket seat cars was also redesigned to fit up against the lower part of the dash, allowed for rear passenger vents, and 2 cup holders for the front occupants.
 1998: Last year for the Regency which kept the old "Rocket" logo. 
 1999: Last year for both Eighty Eight and LSS models. This was also the last Oldsmobile sedan to have 6-passenger seating as an option. The last Oldsmobile LSS was produced on September 23, 1998. The last Oldsmobile Eighty Eight 50th Anniversary Edition was manufactured on January 6, 1999.

Oldsmobile Guidestar
The Guidestar system was based upon the preceding TravTek GPS that Oldsmobile developed in conjunction with Avis Rent a Car and AAA, which was tested in the 1990 through 1992 Toronado Trofeo. After the Toronado was discontinued, Oldsmobile continued working on the system with GM's Hughes Electronics division and EDS. The finished product, Guidestar, was a hard disk-based system that offered satellite navigation for 17 states but lacked live traffic updates. The states were California, Connecticut, Delaware, Florida, Georgia, Illinois, Indiana, Maryland, Maine, Massachusetts, Michigan, New Hampshire, New Jersey, New York, Rhode Island, Vermont and Virginia. It was a $2,000 option, plus $400 per map cartridge. It was the first on-board navigation system to be offered on a US production car, the 1995 Oldsmobile 88.

References

External links 

 The Oldsmobile Connection – The Site For Oldsmobile Enthusiasts
 Photos of the Cutlass being built at Lansing Assembly
 Oldsmobile Club of America

88
Full-size vehicles
Sedans
Coupés
Muscle cars
1950s cars
1960s cars
1970s cars
1980s cars
1990s cars
Cars introduced in 1949